Frederika may refer to:

Frederika, Iowa, United States
Frederika Township, Bremer County, Iowa, United States

See also
Frederica (given name)
Frederica (disambiguation)
Fredrika (disambiguation)
Princess Frederica (disambiguation)
Federica
Frédérique